Malek Yawahab (born June 15, 1983), is a professional footballer from Thailand as a midfielder. Previously Yawahab played for Chiangmai, Chiangrai United, and Songkhla.

Club career

References

External links
 

1983 births
Living people
Malek Yawahab
Malek Yawahab
Malek Yawahab
Malek Yawahab
Malek Yawahab
Malek Yawahab
Malek Yawahab
Malek Yawahab
Association football midfielders
Malek Yawahab